Rabigh Wings Aviation Academy (RWAA) is the Kingdom of Saudi Arabia's first aviation academy.

History 
Aside from being the first aviation academy in the Kingdom, the academy is a modern flight training school. 

The CEO and founder, Turki bin Muqrin bin Abdul-Aziz, is a pilot, businessman, and a member of the House of Saud. Adib Shishakly, a founder of the Syrian National Council, is the Vice CEO. Shishakly, not a pilot, told the Saudi Gazette that he "did all the business side of it from buying the aircraft and delivering them to Rabigh. I also helped structure the maintenance department, the fuel farm, and the marketing and business strategy for the school. We have 15 aircraft: some single engine Cessnas, and single and twin Piper aircraft, as well as two twin engine Seneca Vs."

The academy's first social event was held in 2011 with the Saudi "Street Eagles," a Harley-Davidson club. In 2011, Arab News reported that Rabigh Wings Aviation Academy "is preparing to admit women for training." On May 27, 2012, the Royal Jordanian Air Academy (RJAA) signed a Memorandum of Understanding with Rabigh Wings Aviation Academy (RWAA) "to develop cooperation between the two academies and share experiences in the fields of aviation and aircraft maintenance." The MoU was signed by Turki bin Muqrin bin Abdul-Aziz, and Director General of RJAA Captain Mohammed Khawaldeh.

See also 
 General Authority of Civil Aviation
 Amaala International Airport
 Saudi Vision 2030

References

External links 
 
 Amazing show for Lamborghini's cars with Rabigh Wings Aviation Academy
 Street Eagles ride to meet Sky Eagles Saudi Gazette
 Taking to the sky in Rabigh Saudi Gazette

Aviation in Saudi Arabia
Aviation schools